Tamara Zidanšek was the defending champion, but lost in the second round to Alexandra Panova.

Mihaela Buzărnescu won the title, defeating Danka Kovinić in the final, 6–2, 6–1.

Seeds

Draw

Finals

Top half

Bottom half

References
Main Draw

XIXO Ladies Open Hódmezővásárhely - Singles